Paphiopedilum vietnamense is a species of orchid found from Thái Nguyên Province in northern Vietnam. It was discovered in 1997 and it is endangered.

References

External links 

vietnamense
Endemic orchids of Vietnam
Plants described in 1999